A haystack is a stack of hay.

Haystack or Haystacks may also refer to:

 Haystacks (Monet series), a series of Impressionist paintings by Claude Monet

People
 Haystak (born 1973), American rapper
 Haystacks Calhoun (William Calhoun; 1934–1989), American professional wrestler
 Giant Haystacks (Martin Ruane; 1946–1998), British professional wrestler

Places

Australia
 Haystack, Queensland
 Haystack Island, an island in South Australia

Canada
 Haystack, Newfoundland and Labrador

United Kingdom
 Haystacks (Lake District), a mountain in England

United States
 Haystack, New Mexico, a census-designated place
 Haystack Observatory, a group of radio-telescope astronomical observatories in Massachusetts
 Haystack Rock, a formation just off the coast at Cannon Beach, Oregon
 The Haystacks, enigmatic sandstone mounds in Loyalsock Creek, Sullivan County, Pennsylvania

Science and technology
 Haystack (MIT project), a personal information management/semantic web research software project
 Haystack (software), a network traffic obfuscator and encryptor

Other
 Haystack (food)
 Haystacks: Autumn, a c. 1874 painting by Jean-François Millet
 Haystack Prayer Meeting
 Mogote, a haystack-shaped, erosional, geomorphic structure

See also
 Haystack Mountain (disambiguation)
 Haystack Rock (disambiguation)